Sa Re Ga Ma Pa Lil Champs is an 2016 Indian-Tamil language musical reality TV game show, which airs on Zee Tamil. The show based on the Hindi Language show Sa Re Ga Ma Pa L'il Champs. The series is meant for young children between the ages of 5–14 years, which judges the children on the basis of their voice quality, singing talent and versatility in performance. The show was premiered on 24 December 2016.

Seasons overview

Judges and Hosts

Judges

Host

Season 1
The first season of the show began airing on 24 December 2016 to 7 May 2017 on every Saturday and Sunday at 19:00 (IST) for 40 episodes. The judges are Singers Karthik, Vijay Prakash and Sujatha Mohan. Vishwa Prasad was the winner of season one.

Winners
Guest
 Jiiva: is a Tamil film actor, producer and philanthropist.

 Top 5 Finalist
 Ann Benson
 Vishwa Prasad
 Rakthash
 Disathana
 Niharika

Grand Jury Panel
 Ramji
 S. N. Surendar
 V. Uma Shankar
 Mohan Vaidya
 M. J. Shriram
 Ramya NSK 
 Padmalatha
 Vinaitha
 Tanushree
 Jagadeesh Kumar
 Ninchi 
 Reshmi
 A.SADIQ BASHA
 Nirmala

Season 2
The second season aired on every Sunday at 6:30 pm from 5 May 2018 to 3 November 2018 and ended with 53 Episodes. Karthik, Srinivas,  Sujatha Mohan and Vijay Prakash as the judges and Archana Chandhoke as the host. Idhazhika was the winner of second season.

Winners
Guest
 Sivakarthikeyan: is a Tamil film actor, producer.

Participants

References

External links
 Sa Re Ga Ma Pa Lil Champs at ZEE5

Zee Tamil original programming
Tamil-language singing talent shows
Tamil-language reality television series
2016 Tamil-language television series debuts
Tamil-language television shows
2016 Tamil-language television seasons
Television shows set in Tamil Nadu
2018 Tamil-language television seasons
Television series about children
Television series about teenagers